Jack Albert Wolfe (1936–2005) was a United States Geological Survey paleobotanist and paleoclimatologist best known for his studies of Tertiary climate in western North America through analysis of fossil angiosperm leaves.

References

1936 births
2005 deaths
American paleontologists
Paleobotanists